Bunch of Hair is an island in Carteret County, North Carolina, in the United States.

According to one source, Bunch of Hair might have been intended as a soothing name for an inhospitable place.

References

Islands of North Carolina
Islands of Carteret County, North Carolina